Dorothy Borg (September 4, 1902 Elberon, New Jersey – October 25, 1993 New York City) was an American historian specializing in American-East Asian relations. Although she did not hold faculty appointments, her multi-archival and assiduous scholarship set high standards and her organization of international scholarly cooperation and exchange influenced the field of American history of foreign relations. Her research focused mainly on United States relations with China in the decades between World War I and the arrival in power of the Chinese Revolution in 1949.

Awards
 She received the 1965 Bancroft Prize for her monograph, The United States and the Far Eastern Crisis, 1933-1938.

Works
  American Policy and the Chinese Revolution, 1925-1928 (New York: American Institute of Pacific Relations; Macmillan, 1947; rpr. New York: Octagon, 1968.
The United States and the Far Eastern Crisis, 1933-1938 (Harvard University Press, 1965)

References

1902 births
1996 deaths
People from Long Branch, New Jersey
Wellesley College alumni
Columbia University alumni
Historians of American foreign relations
American women historians
20th-century American historians
20th-century American women writers
Bancroft Prize winners
Historians from New Jersey